General Sir Antony Kenneth Frederick Walker,  (born 16 May 1934) is a former British Army officer who served as Commandant of the Royal College of Defence Studies from 1990 to 1992.

Military career
Educated at Merchant Taylors' School, Walker attended Royal Military Academy, Sandhurst, and was commissioned into the Royal Tank Regiment in 1954. He served in Northern Ireland during the Troubles and was mentioned in despatches. He was appointed Commanding Officer of 1st Royal Tank Regiment in 1974 and commander of the 11th Armoured Brigade in 1978. He went on to be General Officer Commanding 3rd Armoured Division in 1982, Chief of Staff at Headquarters UK Land Forces in 1985 and Deputy Chief of Defence Staff (Commitments) at the Ministry of Defence in 1987. His last appointment was as Commandant of the Royal College of Defence Studies in 1990 before he retired in 1992.

Walker was appointed a Knight Commander of the Order of the Bath in 1987.

In retirement Walker was Director-General of the British Institute of Facilities Management 1998–2001, and Communications Director for Aqumen Facilities Management, then a subsidiary of Mowlem.

References

|-

|-

1934 births
Living people
People educated at Merchant Taylors' School, Northwood
Graduates of the Royal Military Academy Sandhurst
Royal Tank Regiment officers
British military personnel of The Troubles (Northern Ireland)
British Army generals
Knights Commander of the Order of the Bath